The 2011 World Junior Curling Championships were held from 5 to 13 March at the Dewars Centre in Perth, Scotland. In the men's tournament, Sweden's Oskar Eriksson won the final 6-5 over Switzerland's Peter de Cruz, while Scotland's Eve Muirhead won 10-3 in the final over Canada's Trish Paulsen in the women's tournament.

Men

Teams

Standings

Round robin

Draw 1
Saturday 5 March, 9:00

Draw 2
Saturday 5 March, 19:00

Draw 3
Sunday 6 March, 14:00

Draw 4
Monday 7 March, 9:00

Draw 5
Monday 7 March, 19:00

Draw 6
Tuesday 8 March, 14:00

Draw 7
Wednesday 9 March, 9:00

Draw 8
Wednesday 9 March, 19:00

Draw 9
Thursday 10 March, 12:30

Challenge Game

Winner advances to 2012 World Junior Curling Championships; Loser relegated to 2012 European Junior Curling Challenge.

Playoffs

1 vs. 2
Friday 11 March, 19:00

3 vs. 4
Friday 11 March, 19:00

Semifinal
Saturday 12 March, 18:00

Bronze-medal game
Sunday 13 March, 9:00

Final
Sunday 13 March, 9:00

Women

Teams

Round-robin standings
Final round-robin standings

Round robin

Draw 1
Saturday 5 March, 14:00

Draw 2
Sunday 6 March, 9:00

Draw 3
Sunday 6 March, 19:00

Draw 4
Monday 7 March, 14:00

Draw 5
Tuesday 8 March, 9:00

Draw 6
Tuesday 8 March, 19:00

Draw 7
Wednesday 9 March, 14:00

Draw 8
Thursday 10 March, 8:00

Draw 9
Thursday 10 March, 17:00

Tiebreakers
Friday 11 March, 14:00

Playoffs

1 vs. 2
Saturday 12 March, 12:00

3 vs. 4
Saturday 12 March, 12:00

Semifinal
Saturday 12 March, 18:00

Bronze-medal game
Sunday 13 March, 13:00

Final
Sunday 13 March, 13:00

External links
Official site

World Junior Curling Championships, 2011
World Junior Curling Championships
Sport in Perth, Scotland
World Junior Curling Championships
World Junior Curling Championships
International curling competitions hosted by Scotland
World Junior Curling Championships